This is a list of journalists killed during the Balochistan conflict. The conflict has been going on since 1947, but since 2001, 28–33 journalists have been killed and between 2009 and 2012 at over 23 journalists have been killed.

List
 Khalil Ullah Sumalani

2008
 Chisti Mujahid, a columnist for Akhbar-i-Jehan, was assassinated by the Baloch Liberation Army in Quetta, 9 February 2008, for an article he had written about the death of leader Balach Marri.
 Khadim Hussain Sheikh, a journalist for the Urdu-language Khabrein, was killed in Hub, 14 April 2008.

2009
 Wasi Ahmed Qureshi, Daily Azadi, died 16 April 2009, in Khuzdar from gunshot wounds from days earlier. Some news report claim that Baloch liberation army was responsible for killing Wasi Ahmed Qureshi.

2010
 Malik Mohammad Arif, a Samaa TV camera operator, was killed by a suicide bomber on 16 April 2010.
 Faiz Muhammad Sasoli, Aaj Kal, was shot to death 27 June 2010 in Khuzdar while driving and after having survived two previous attempts on his life. Baloch Liberation Army (BLA), a militant group, claimed responsibility for killing him.
 Abdul Hameed Hayatan, a.k.a., Lala Hamid Baloch.
 Mohammad Sarwar
 Ejaz Raisani died from injuries 6 September 2010 from an earlier suicide bomb.

2011
 Ilyas Nazar
 Wali Khan Babar, GEO News – 13 January 2011, Karachi
 Abdost Rind, Daily Eagle (Urdu) – 18 February 2011, around Turbat
 Rehmat Ullah Shaheen
 Zarif Faraz
 Siddique Eido
 Munir Ahmed Shakir Sabzbaat, a Baloch TV station – 14 August 2011, Khuzdar
 Akhter Mirza
 Javed Naseer Rind, Daily Tawar – sometime between 11 September 2011 and 5 November 2011

2012
 Razzaq Gul Baloch, Express News – 19 May 2012, Turbat
 Haji Mohammad Rafique Achakzai
 Abdul Qadir Hajizai. He was killed by Baloch Liberation Front (BLF) in Washik district.
 Dilshad Deyani
 Abdul Haq Baloch
 Khalid Musa
 Abdul Ahad Baloch
 Rehmat Ullah Abdi
 Jamshaid Ali Karl

2013
 Saif-ur-Rehman Baloch
 Muhammad Imran Sheikh
 Mohammad Iqbal
 Mehmood Ahmed Afridi. He was killed by Baloch Liberation Army (BLA) in Kalat.
 Haji Abdul Razzaq Baloch, Daily Tawar – sometime between 24 March 2013 & 24 August 2013

2014
 Attack on the Online International News Network killed two journalists and one media worker on 28 August 2014 in Quetta. Irshad Mastoi was believed to have been the target while student reporter Abdul Rasul and accountant Mohammed Younus were also killed.

2020 

 Sajid Hussain (journalist)

See also
 Censorship in Pakistan

References

External links
 Baloch Missing

Killed
Insurgency in Balochistan
Journalists killed, Balochistan
Balochistan
Balochistan
Journalists